The men's mass start race of the 2014–15 ISU Speed Skating World Cup 5, arranged in the Vikingskipet arena in Hamar, Norway, was held on 1 February 2015.

Lee Seung-hoon of South Korea won the race, while Marco Weber of Germany came second, and Bart Swings of Belgium came third. With his win, Lee extended his lead in the mass start cup to 164 points, thus securing the title, as only 150 points are available for the winner in the last competition weekend in Erfurt, Germany.

Results
The race took place on Sunday, 1 February, scheduled in the afternoon session, at 15:31.

References

Men mass start
5